In the run-up to the 1966 general election, various polling organisations conducted opinion polling to gauge voting intention amongst the general public. Such polls, dating from the previous election in 1964 to polling day on 31 March 1966, are listed in this article.

Polling results 

All Data is from PollBase

1966

1965

1964

References

Opinion polling for United Kingdom general elections